The Puerto Rico Department of Correction and Rehabilitation is the law enforcement executive department of the government responsible for structuring, developing, and coordinating the public policies in Puerto Rico, an unincorporated territory of the U.S. The department has authority over its correctional system and the rehabilitation of its adult and young population who have broken the law.

History 

In August 2015, the department was one of eight identified by the Department of Justice as "high-risk" recipients of federal money, based on audits showing "irregular spending and lax internal controls".

In January 2016, $10 million of delayed payments to the department's vendor, Trinity Services Group, threatened to interrupt the food supply to all of its 12,500 inmates.

In 2018 the department under secretary planned to transfer as many as 1,200 inmates outside the island  with the intention of transferring 30% of all inmates. The program intended to save millions and close six prisons. The program received criticism from families of inmates concerned about keeping in contact with their relatives and the negative effects the plan could have on rehabilitating inmates. The program remained on hold a year later due to lack of funds and contract issues for the transfers.

In February 2021 the Juvenile Institutions Administrations reported an increase in mental health incidents among juvenile inmates.

Secretary

The Secretary of Corrections and Rehabilitation is the appointed official responsible for setting the public policy of Puerto Rico for its corrections, rehabilitation and parole systems.

In 2021 Ana I. Escobar Pabón was confirmed as secretary of the department.

Agencies
 Corrections Administration
 Juvenile Institutions Administration (Negociado de Instituciones Juveniles NIJ)
 Labor and Training Enterprises Corporation
 Office of Pretrial Services
 Parole Board

Prisons
There are no private prisons in Puerto Rico, but the territory has contracted with corrections companies in the past.

In March 1993 the government made a three-year agreement with city officials in Appleton, Minnesota to fill all 516 beds of their Prairie Correctional Facility with Puerto Rican inmates.  The prison had been built by the city and was sitting empty.  Early disputes "underscored the communication problem among inmates and guards".  With the introduction of additional prisoners from Colorado and resulting inmate unrest, city officials ended the contract.

In March 2012, Puerto Rico contracted with Corrections Corporation of America to send as many as 480 inmates to CCA's Cimarron Correctional Facility near Cushing, Oklahoma.  The three-year contract was brought to a premature close in June 2013 after unit-wide fights and "disruptive events", with the inmates sent home.

Current 
Following is a list of Puerto Rico's 33 state prisons.  This list does not include federal prisons (such as the Metropolitan Detention Center, Guaynabo) or jails of other jurisdictions.

 Institución Correccional Guerrero, Aguadilla, stated capacity 1000
 Centro de Detención del Oeste, Mayagüez, Puerto Rico, capacity 546
 Anexo Sabana Hoyos 384, Arecibo, Puerto Rico, capacity 384
 Centro de Tratamiento Residencial, Arecibo, capacity 75
 Institución Correccional Sabana Hoyos 728, Arecibo, capacity 728
 Institución Correccional Sabana Hoyos 216, Arecibo, capacity 216
 Programa Agrícola de la Montaña-La Pica, Jayuya, capacity 50
 Anexo Custodia Mínima, Ponce, capacity 192
 Centro de Clasificacion Fase III, Ponce, capacity 280
 Centro de Ingresos del Sur Ponce 676, Ponce, capacity 676
 Institución Adults Ponce 1000, Ponce, capacity 831
 Institución Correccional Juvenes Adultes, Ponce, capacity 304
 Facilidad Medica Correccional, Ponce, capacity 486
 Institución Máxima Seguridad, Ponce, capacity 420
 Institución Correccional Ponce Juvenes Adultes 224, Ponce, capacity 224
 Institución Correccional Ponce Principal, Ponce, capacity 534
 Vivienda alterna Anexo 246, Ponce, capacity 246
 Modular Detention Unit (MDU), Ponce, capacity 224
 Centro con Libertad Para Trabajar, Ponce, capacity 112
 Escuela Industrial para Mujeres Vega Alta, Vega Alta, capacity 471
 Anexo Seguridad Máxima, Bayamón, capacity 292
 Institución Correccional Bayamón 308/488, Bayamón, capacity 563
 Centro de Ingresos Metropolitano, Bayamón, capacity 705
 Institución Correccional Bayamón 501, Bayamón, capacity 516
 Centro Detencion Bayamón 1072, Bayamón, capacity 1428
 Hogar Intermedio para Mujeres, San Juan, capacity 38
 Campamento Zarzal Dirección, Río Grande, capacity 500
 Institución Correccional Zarzal, Río Grande, capacity 450
 Hogar de Adaptación Social, Fajardo, capacity 36
 Anexo Guayama 296, Guayama, capacity 296
 Institución Correccional Guayama 945, Guayama, capacity 320
 Institución Correccional Guayama 500, Guayama, capacity 516
 Institución Correccional Guayama Máxima Seguridad 1000, Guayama, capacity 529

The main women's prison, Escuela Industrial para Mujeres Vega Alta, opened in 1954, replacing a prison in Areceibo. Work began on the facility in 1952. Puerto Rico also operates the Hogar de Adaptación Social en Vega Alta, which opened in 1987, and the Hogar Intermedio para Mujeres in Río Piedras, which opened in 1996.

Former 
Puerto Rico's former prison facilities include:

  Río Piedras State Penitentiary (opened 1933, closed 2004, demolished 2015)

References

External links
 Puerto Rico Department of Corrections and Rehabilitation 
 

Executive departments of the government of Puerto Rico
State corrections departments of the United States
 
1993 establishments in Puerto Rico